Perkins High School is a public high school in Perkins Township, Ohio, near Sandusky. It is the only high school in the Perkins Local School District. They are known as the Pirates and school colors are black and white with an accent of red.

Ohio High School Athletic Association state championships

 Boys Football – 1999
 Boys Cross Country – 1987, 1988, 1989
 Boys Track and Field – 1984, 2008
 Girls Track and Field – 1993
 Girls Golf - 2012

Marching band
The Perkins Pirate Marching Band has had the honor of qualifying for the Ohio Music Education Association (OMEA) State Marching Band Finals every year since its creation in 1980 until 2016.

In 2012 the band received a Superior Rating (I) at the Maumee Marching Band Competition in Maumee, Ohio, the North Coast Marching Band Festival at Perkins High School, and the Swanton Bulldog Bowl in Swanton, Ohio. At the State Marching Band Finals in November, they received a Superior Rating (I). The director of the band is John Kustec.

The Perkins Pirate Band Program officially took the lead in 2006 for having the largest student-to-band member ratio in the state of Ohio, 188 students in band, with over one-third of the high school population involved in the band program.

The Pirate Band qualified for the State Finals by receiving Superior Ratings at both the Maumee, Swanton, and North Coast (held at PHS) Marching Band Competitions in October 2013. At the Swanton Bulldog Bull, the band received 3rd Place Overall, best Percussion, and best Auxiliaries. The entire marching band, including musicians, Flags, Pirettes and Pit Crew are judged on the performance of their music, marching and drills. The PHS Marching Band received Superior Ratings in all of these individual categories.

Notable alumni
Jay Crawford - (Class of 1983) sports anchor for Sportscenter
Brian Bixler - (Class of 2001) perennial major league baseball infielder

References

External links
 District Website
 2005 OMEA State Finals - Perkins High School Marching Band - Superior Rating
https://web.archive.org/web/20100914201129/http://www.perkins.k12.oh.us/vnews/display.v/ART/48c5c1f53c0a1

High schools in Erie County, Ohio
Public high schools in Ohio